Eslamabad (also Romanized as Eslāmābād) is a village in Eslamiyeh Rural District, in the Central District of Rafsanjan County, Kerman Province, Iran. At the 2006 census, its population was 3,019, in 735 families.

References 

Populated places in Rafsanjan County